The Crusade is a 2021 French drama film directed by Louis Garrel, from a screenplay by Garrel and Jean-Claude Carrière. It stars Garrel, Laetitia Casta and Joseph Engel.

It had its world premiere at the Cannes Film Festival on 12 July 2021. It was released in France on 22 December 2021.

Plot
Abel and Marianne have discovered their son has smuggled valuable items to finance a mysterious project with other children to save the planet.

Cast
 Louis Garrel as Abel
 Laetitia Casta as Marianne
 Joseph Engel as Joseph
 Ilinka Lony as Clotilde
 Julia Boème as Lucie
 Lionel Dray as Jérôme Lhomond
 Clémence Jeanguillaume as Audrey Lhomond

Release
The film had its world premiere at the Cannes Film Festival on 12 July 2021. It was theatrically released in France on 22 December 2021 by Ad Vitam Distribution.

References

External links
 

2021 films
French comedy films
Films directed by Louis Garrel
2020s French films